Southern New England Telecommunications Corporation (SNET) started operations in 1986 as the holding company for The Southern New England Telephone Company. Prior to 1986, The Southern New England Telephone Company had been a minority holding of AT&T until February 1986, when AT&T withdrew its 23% holding. SNET then became its own company, operating a telecommunications sales division, Sonecor Systems Division, which began operations on January 1, 1983, and sold equipment in competition with AT&T before the Bell System divestiture. SNET also operated SNET America, which sold long-distance services to Southern New England Telephone customers within Connecticut.

Under threats of a hostile takeover, Southern New England Telephone underwent a restructuring in 1986, creating Southern New England Telecommunications as the holding company of SNET and its related businesses.

Southern New England Telecommunications was acquired by SBC Communications in 1998.

SNET Corporation was merged into AT&T Teleholdings, formerly Ameritech, in 2006 and ceased to exist.

Sale of former assets
On December 17, 2013, AT&T announced plans to sell the former subsidiaries of SNET, The Southern New England Telephone Company and long-distance subsidiary SNET America, to Frontier Communications for $2 billion. The transaction is expected to close in the second half of 2014.

References

Further reading  
 Benson, Jr., Reuel A., The First Century of the Telephone in Connecticut.  Southern New England Telephone, New Haven, Connecticut, 1978. 
 White, James A., and Paul Ingrassia. "AT&T Break-up Gives Two Mavericks an Opportunity to Compete in New Fields." Wall Street Journal, April 10, 1982. 
 "The Brassiest Bell Company." Business Week, March 14, 1983. 
 Sanger, Elizabeth, "Eat Well or Sleep Well?" Barron's, October 10, 1983.

Former AT&T subsidiaries
Communications in Connecticut
Telecommunications companies established in 1986
Telecommunications companies disestablished in 2006
2006 disestablishments in Connecticut
1986 establishments in Connecticut
Defunct companies based in Connecticut
Defunct telecommunications companies of the United States
Companies based in New Haven, Connecticut